Manvel High School is a public high school located along Texas State Highway 6 in the city of Manvel, Texas, USA. It is a part of the Alvin Independent School District located in northern Brazoria County. In 2017, the school was rated "Met Standard" by the Texas Education Agency, with a 1-Star Distinction for Academic Achievement in Top 25 Percent Student Progress.

History 
Manvel High School opened in Fall 2006 with only 9th and 10th grades. The high school, one of five to be established in the suburban areas of Greater Houston in 2006, was projected to have 706 students in its first year. By 2008 it had 1,200 students, and by 2009 it had 1,630 students.

Manvel High School, Alvin ISD's second high school, was established to serve the western portion of Alvin ISD, and provided relief for Alvin High School upon the opening. Darrell Alexander was the first principal of Manvel High School. By April 2006 Alvin ISD had hired assistant principals, athletic coaches, a librarian, and a band director for Manvel High. Its first class, consisting of 275 fourth-year students (seniors), graduated in 2009.

Manvel High was built in two phases. Gamma Construction Co. built this phase and SHW Group designed it. The school's capacity increased to 2,500. Construction on the auditorium was delayed due to damages from Hurricane Ike in September 2008; the construction company had to replace the previous sets of steel with new ones. The school's elevator was the first in the city limits of Manvel, and the only elevator until the construction of a hotel just north of the school on Highway 6.

In fall 2022 it will be relieved by the opening of Iowa Colony High School.

Communities served 
As of 2022 the school serves the northern portion of Manvel above Texas State Highway 6 and a small portion of Iowa Colony above Highway 6.

Manvel previously served all of Manvel, all of Iowa Colony, and additional portions of unincorporated Brazoria County (including Lakes of Savannah, the area around Rosharon). Its service area formerly included Meridiana. 

It formerly served Shadow Creek Ranch and other parts of Pearland, until the opening of Shadow Creek High School.

Athletics
The Manvel Mavericks compete in these sports - 

Baseball
Basketball
Cross Country
Football
Golf
Powerlifting
Soccer
Softball
Swimming and Diving
Tennis
Track and Field
Volleyball

In 2006 Kirk Martin was hired as the assistant athletic director and as the American football coach. The first volleyball coach previously worked in schools in Illinois and was last working as a coach and teacher at Clear Creek High School. Varsity volleyball was scheduled to begin in 2007. Varsity American football games for Manvel High began in 2008.

The school adopted a Lakota Sioux-era rallying cry, "Hoka Hey," for use in athletic competitions.

State titles
Girls Basketball
2014 (5A)
Boys Track
2015 (6A)

State finalist
Football
2011 (4A/D2) Lost to Aledo 49-28 in championship game
2017 (5A/D1) Lost to Dallas Highland Park 53-49 in championship game

Academics

State titles
News Writing
2010(4A) - Cory Ryncarz
Social Studies
2011(4A) - Cory Ryncarz

School culture
The teacher of the year and paraprofessional of the year each receive a letter jacket after being awarded as such. Over the years, multiple MHS students have been lost to car accidents and other events; in their honor, there is a tree and a plaque bearing their names in front of the school.

Student discipline
Phillip Mena and Jill Courtney of KHOU-TV wrote that the number of fights that occurred in the 2011-2012 and 2012-2013 school years, 48, were "not out of the ordinary for similar-sized schools in the area." In April 2014, a student was stabbed in a fight.

Notable alumni

 Kyle Trask - Quarterback for the Florida Gators, Heisman Trophy finalist
 D'Eriq King - Quarterback for the Miami Hurricanes
Brianna Turner, Phoenix Mercury forward

References

External links

 

Alvin Independent School District high schools
2006 establishments in Texas
Educational institutions established in 2006